Brigitte Alice Askonas  (1 April 1923 – 9 January 2013) was a British immunologist and a visiting professor at Imperial College London from 1995.

Education
Brigitte Askonas was born to Czechoslovak parents, Jewish converts to Catholicism, who fled Austria after the Nazi takeover.
Vienna-born Askonas studied biochemistry at McGill University (BSc, MSc) and carried out her postgraduate work in the school of biochemistry at the University of Cambridge where she was a student of Girton College, Cambridge.

Her role models in the department included two distinguished scientists, Marjory Stephenson and Dorothy Needham, two of the first women to be elected to the Royal Society. She said they taught her that "good science gets recognition regardless of the sex of the scientist". Her PhD research was supervised by Malcolm Dixon.

Career and research
Her first position was at the Allan Memorial Institute of Psychiatry (associated with McGill University). In 1952, she joined the staff of the National Institute for Medical Research (NIMR) where she served as head of the division of Immunology from 1976 to 1988.

During that time, she worked extensively with fellow immunologist John H. Humphrey to establish the immunology divisions. Askonas focused on B cells and determined their role in producing antibodies as part of the immune response.

At the NIMR she began researching the biosynthesis of polypeptides in milk proteins discovering that the peptides were synthesised from amino acids rapidly in one piece. From 1955-59 she studied the sites of antibody formation using radioactivity to develop our understanding of antibody molecules and the cells of the immune system. From 1959-61 she studied plasma cell tumors as models for antibody formation. She went on to investigate macrophages and their role in antigen presentation (1962–1968). From 1963 to 1966 she studied the fate of antigen in relation to antibody formation and later continued her study of B cells from 1965 to 1970.

She wrote several biographies of high-profile scientists, including Niels Kaj Jerne, César Milstein and John Herbert Humphrey. Askonas conducted a filmed interview with Stanley Peart as a segment of what became the Medical Sciences Video Archive housed in the special collections of the library at Oxford Brookes University.

Awards and honours
In 2007 she was made a foreign associate of the National Academy of Sciences of the United States and won the Robert Koch Prize. She was also elected a Fellow of the Royal Society (FRS) in 1973 and a Fellow of the Academy of Medical Sciences (FMedSci).

References

1923 births
2013 deaths
Alumni of Girton College, Cambridge
Austrian emigrants to the United Kingdom
British immunologists
Female Fellows of the Royal Society
Fellows of the Academy of Medical Sciences (United Kingdom)
Fellows of Girton College, Cambridge
Foreign associates of the National Academy of Sciences
McGill University Faculty of Science alumni
National Institute for Medical Research faculty
Place of death missing
20th-century American women scientists
20th-century American scientists
Fellows of the Royal Society
21st-century American women